The Internal Comptroller's Office of the Federal Electoral Tribunal is a specialized body within the Federal Electoral Tribunal of Mexico that is in charge of monitoring compliance with the regulations and agreements issued by the Administration Commission, through audits, control reviews and evaluations of compliance with the management of the resources granted to the administrative units. 

It also substantiates administrative liability procedures within the scope of its competence

Constituent Units 

The Internal Comptroller's Office of the Federal Electoral Tribunal it is integrated by three areas: the Comptroller, Control and Evaluation Unit, the Substantiation of Responsibilities Unit and the Asset Registration, Monitoring and Patrimonial evolution Unit.

See also
Federal Electoral Institute
Federal Electoral Tribunal

External links
Federal Electoral Tribunal website
Internal Comptroller's Office website

References

Law of Mexico
Judiciary of Mexico
Elections in Mexico
Mexico